Aala Ki Dhani is a village  located in Girwa Tehsil of Udaipur district in the Indian state of Rajasthan. As per Population Census 2011, Aachhat village has population of 1096 of which 567 are males while 529 are females.

It is administrated by Sarpanch (Head of Village) who is elected representative of village.

References 

Villages in Udaipur district